Guirado is a surname. Notable people with the surname include:

Ángel Guirado (born 1984), Filipino footballer
Guilhem Guirado (born 1986), French rugby union player
Javier Guirado (born 1985), Spanish weightlifter
Juan Antonio Guirado (1932-2010), Spanish artist
Catalina Guirado (born 1974), British-New Zealander model and TV star
Juan Luis Guirado (born 1979), Filipino footballer
Marcela Guirado (born 1989), Mexican actress and singer